Third Time Lucky is a British comedy television series which originally aired on ITV in 1982. A man meets his divorced first wife, and rekindles his romance with her.

Main cast
 Derek Nimmo as George Hutchenson
 Nerys Hughes as Beth Jenkins
 Debbie Farrington as Clare Hutchenson
 Lorraine Brunning as Jenny Hutchenson
 Clifford Earl as Bruce Jenkins
 Angela Douglas as Millie King
 Angela Piper as Sally Jenkins
 Gerald Flood as Henry King
 Robert Craig-Morgan as Peter
 Nigel Greaves as Christopher Tracy

References

External links
 

1982 British television series debuts
1982 British television series endings
1980s British comedy television series
ITV sitcoms
English-language television shows
Television series by Yorkshire Television